Houck's Chapel is a historic Methodist church located at Hickory, Catawba County, North Carolina. It was built in 1888, and is a small, rectangular frame church building.  It is two bays wide and four deep and rests on a stone pier foundation.  Atop the roof is a pyramidal roofed belfry. Also on the property is the contributing church cemetery.

It was listed on the National Register of Historic Places in 1985.

Houck's Chapel has been restored by the Hickory Landmarks Society and is open for tours by appointment.

References

External links
 Houck's Chapel - Hickory Landmarks Society

Hickory, North Carolina
Churches on the National Register of Historic Places in North Carolina
Churches completed in 1888
19th-century Methodist church buildings in the United States
Churches in Catawba County, North Carolina
National Register of Historic Places in Catawba County, North Carolina
Museums in Catawba County, North Carolina